Transformation is the first studio album by bassist Tal Wilkenfeld, released independently on 14 May 2007. The album was recorded when she was 19 years old, having moved to the United States from her native Australia.

Track listing

Personnel
Tal Wilkenfeld – bass, arrangement, producer
Wayne Krantz – guitar
Geoffrey Keezer – keyboard, piano
Keith Carlock – drums
Samuel Torres – percussion (track 3)
Oteil Burbridge – bass melody (track 6)
Seamus Blake - saxophone
Malcolm Pollack – engineering
Roy Hendrickson – engineering (overdubs)
Bryan Pugh – engineering assistance
Joe Ferla – mixing
Bernie Grundman – mastering

References

External links
Tal Wilkenfeld: Serendipity at jazz.com

2007 debut albums
Self-released albums